Beauce may refer to:

 Beauce, France, a natural region in northern France
 Beaucé, a commune in the Ille-et-Vilaine department, Brittany, France
 Beauce, Quebec, an historical and cultural region of Canada
 Beauce (electoral district), a federal electoral district in Quebec
 Beauce (provincial electoral district), a defunct provincial electoral district now split into Beauce-Nord and Beauce-Sud 
 Beauce (Province of Canada), a defunct pre-Confederation electoral district

See also